Bande Utkala Janani is an Odia patriotic poem written by Laxmikanta Mohapatra in 1912. Odisha became the first state in British India to be formed on linguistic basis on 1 April 1936. The music was first recorded by Gokul Mohanty in 1932. The modern notation was arranged by the Odissi musician Balakrushna Dash which was adopted as the state anthem. The Odisha Cabinet on 7 June 2020, accorded the poem the status as the Anthem of Odisha.

History 

This song was first sung at the Utkal Sammilani's Conference at Balasore in 1912. It was used as a weapon by the Utkal Sammilani to emancipate Odisha. In a meeting at Bhadrak, where the poet  Mohapatra was felicitated, the then young leader of Odisha Harekrushna Mahtab admitted that the poet Laxmikanta's patriotic songs have inspired him a lot. In the past, outsiders like  Mughals, Marathas and Britishers ruled Odisha and its geographical boundaries changed from time to time accordingly.

The poem envisages a Utkala who maintains her self-respect and dignity from a position of confidence and strength rather than insecurity and fear. This movement for a separate province also gathered momentum in Odisha. The Utkal Sammilani (a federation of Odias) was leading this movement. This influenced the poet Laxmikanta Mohapatra, who was then young and energetic. He started writing Bande Utkala Janani (Glory To The Mother Utkala!) and some other fiery songs with a patriotic motive. Well, known national poet of Odisha Banchhanidhi Mohanty was also a good singer. He used to sing Laxmikanta's patriotic songs throughout Odisha and inspired everyone. Once Rabindra Nath Tagore wrote in one of his essays i.e. "A Vision of India's History" that 'the history of India has been the history of a struggle between the mechanical spirit of conformity in social organization and the creative spirit of man which seeks freedom and love in self-expression' justifies Laxmikanta as a true patriotic poet.

Adoption

The State Government's decision to stand up to pay respect when the song is played has been praised. Therefore, it was made compulsory at the end of any Odisha Legislative Assembly Session and in the beginning of school prayer in State Govt. schools in Odisha during the 1990s.

It was a long standing demand of people of the state to accord state song status to this poem which has been passed by the State cabinet meeting chaired by Chief Minister Naveen Patnaik after the Odias across the globe had come together on the clarion of Chief Minister of Odisha Naveen Patnaik to sing Bande Utkala Janani on 5:30 pm of May 30 to boost the morale of frontline workers or COVID-19 warriors tackling the coronavirus outbreak.

Lyrics

See also

 List of Indian state songs

References

External links

Bande Utkala Janani

Odia culture
Odia-language poems
Indian state songs